The 42nd annual Berlin International Film Festival was held from 13 to 24 February 1992. The festival opened with The Inner Circle by Andrei Konchalovsky. The Golden Bear was awarded to American film Grand Canyon directed by Lawrence Kasdan. The retrospective dedicated to Babelsberg Studios films was shown at the festival.

Jury

The following people were announced as being on the jury for the festival:
 Annie Girardot, actress (France) - Jury President
 Charles Champlin, writer and film critic (United States)
 Sylvia Chang, actress, director and screenwriter (Taiwan)
 Ildikó Enyedi, director and screenwriter (Hungary)
 Irving N. Ivers, executive of the 20th Century Fox (Canada)
 Wolfgang Klaue, archivist, former president of FIAF (Germany)
 Fernando Lara, film critic and writer (Spain)
 Eldar Shengelaya, director and screenwriter (Georgia)
 Dahlia Shapira, film distributor (Israel)
 Michael Verhoeven, actor, director, screenwriter and producer (Germany)
 Susannah York, actress (United Kingdom)

Films in competition
The following films were in competition for the Golden Bear and Silver Bear awards:

Key
{| class="wikitable" width="550" colspan="1"
| style="background:#FFDEAD;" align="center"| †
|Winner of the main award for best film in its section
|-
| colspan="2"| The opening and closing films are screened during the opening and closing ceremonies respectively.
|}

Awards
The following prizes were awarded by the Jury:
 Golden Bear: Grand Canyon by Lawrence Kasdan
 Silver Bear – Special Jury Prize: Édes Emma, drága Böbe – vázlatok, aktok by István Szabó
 Silver Bear for Best Director: Jan Troell for Il capitano
 Silver Bear for Best Actress: Maggie Cheung for Yuen Ling-yuk
 Silver Bear for Best Actor: Armin Mueller-Stahl for Utz
 Silver Bear for an outstanding single achievement: Ricardo Larraín for La frontera
 Silver Bear for an outstanding artistic contribution: Beltenebros
 Honourable Mention: Gudrun by Hans W. Geißendörfer
 Alfred-Bauer Prize: Infinitas by Marlen Khutsiev
 Berlinale Camera: Hal Roach
FIPRESCI Award
Conte d'hiver by Eric Rohmer

References

External links
 42nd Berlin International Film Festival 1992
 1992 Berlin International Film Festival
 Berlin International Film Festival:1992 at Internet Movie Database

42
1992 film festivals
1992 in Berlin
Berl
Berlin